The Big Bang Theory is an American comedy television series created and executively produced by Chuck Lorre and Bill Prady for CBS. Like the name of the series itself (with the exception of the first episode "Pilot"), episode titles of The Big Bang Theory always start with "The" and resemble the name of a scientific principle, theory or experiment, whimsically referencing a plot point or quirk in that episode.

 There is also an earlier pilot, that differs greatly from the series, that never aired on CBS.

Series overview

Episodes

Season 1 (2007–08)

Season 2 (2008–09)

Season 3 (2009–10)

Season 4 (2010–11)

Season 5 (2011–12)

Season 6 (2012–13)

Season 7 (2013–14)

Season 8 (2014–15)

Season 9 (2015–16)

Season 10 (2016–17)

Season 11 (2017–18)

Season 12 (2018–19)

Special (2019)

References

External links

Lists of American sitcom episodes